HMS Prince Regent was a 120-gun first rate three-decker ship of the line of the Royal Navy, launched on 12 April 1823 at Chatham.

Served in the Baltic campaign in 1854 (1st campaign) but not in 1855 (2nd campaign) during the Crimean War.

She was converted into a screw ship in 1861, and was broken up in 1873.

Notes

References

Lavery, Brian (2003) The Ship of the Line - Volume 1: The development of the battlefleet 1650-1850. Conway Maritime Press. .
Lyon, David and Winfield, Rif (2004) The Sail and Steam Navy List: All the Ships of the Royal Navy 1815-1889. Chatham Publishing, London. .

External links
 

Ships of the line of the Royal Navy
Caledonia-class ships of the line
Ships built in Chatham
Crimean War naval ships of the United Kingdom
1823 ships